Centre Street  is one of the 15 constituencies in the Central and Western District, Hong Kong.

The constituency returns one district councillor to the Central and Western District Council, with an election every four years.

Centre Street constituency is loosely based on the area around Centre Street in Sai Ying Pun with estimated population of 15,003.

Councillors represented

Election results

2010s

2000s

1990s

Notes

Citations

References
2011 District Council Election Results (Central & Western)
2007 District Council Election Results (Central & Western)
2006 Central and Western District Council Centre Street Constituency By-election Result
2003 District Council Election Results (Central & Western)
1999 District Council Election Results (Central & Western)

Constituencies of Hong Kong
1994 in Hong Kong
1999 in Hong Kong
2003 in Hong Kong
2007 in Hong Kong
2011 in Hong Kong
Constituencies of Central and Western District Council
Sai Ying Pun
Constituencies established in 1999
1999 establishments in Hong Kong